High on the Happy Side is the third studio album by Scottish pop rock quartet Wet Wet Wet. The album was released on 27 January 1992 and reached the top of the UK Albums Chart on 8 February. The release of the album was preceded by the singles "Make It Tonight", "Put the Light On" and "Goodnight Girl", and followed by two further singles, "More than Love" and "Lip Service".

High on the Happy Side was released both a single album and as a double album with Cloak & Dagger, a covers album released under the pseudonym Maggie Pie & The Impostors. To accompany the album's release, a video compilation entitled The Story So Far, containing videos for singles from both High on the Happy Side and Holding Back the River, was made available on 24 March 1992.

Track listing

Cloak & Dagger

Cloak & Dagger is a free album of cover versions released with the deluxe edition High on the Happy Side. Included with the deluxe versions of the CD, Cassette & Vinyl pressings of the album, Cloak & Dagger was recorded and released under the pseudonym Maggie Pie & The Impostors, a fake veteran act from Scotland. Notably, the album cover pictures unofficial band member Graeme Duffin on an album cover for the first time, having only previously appeared in group shots featured in the booklet of the band's second studio album, Holding Back the River.

Tracklisting

Personnel
 Marti Pellow – lead vocals, backing vocals
 Graeme Clark – bass, double bass, acoustic guitar, backing vocals
 Neil Mitchell – piano, keyboards
 Tommy Cunningham – drums, percussion, backing vocals
 Graeme Duffin – electric and acoustic guitar, backing vocals

Charts

Certifications

References

1992 albums
Wet Wet Wet albums
Mercury Records albums
Covers albums